Thompson v. Hubbard, 131 U.S. 123 (1889), was a United States Supreme Court case in which the Court held that a later owner of a copyright is entitled to sue a previous owner for copyright infringement. However, the later owner's failure to observe formalities voids copyright and a nonexistent copyright cannot be infringed.

References

External links
 

1889 in United States case law
United States copyright case law
United States Supreme Court cases
United States Supreme Court cases of the Fuller Court